Kistin Gorge is a gorge of the Armkhi River in the Dzheyrakhsky District of the Republic of Ingushetia. The name of the gorge comes from the historical name of the river Armkhi — Kistinka, which in turn comes from one of the ethnonyms of the Ingush - Kists. Historically, the area where the gorge is located was called "Kistetia". It is mentioned in medieval Georgian sources, in particular, in the work of		Vakhushti Bagrationi.

History 
According to the legends, this road was controlled by the Tsurovs and the Yandievs. They "kept guard there and took tribute for the passage".

In Russian documents, the name was first mentioned in the first half of the XIX century, in military reports from the period of the Caucasian War, for example, in the Report of the Commander-in-Chief of the Separate Caucasian Corps, Field Marshal Paskevich-Erivansky, to the head of the main headquarters E.I.V. Adjutant General Chernyshev on the results of a military expedition to Mountainous Ingushetia under the command of Major General Abkhazov dated August 31, 1830.

References

Bibliography 
 
 
 

Canyons and gorges of Russia